"I Give You My Word" is a song recorded by Canadian country music artist George Fox. Released in 1997 as the first single from his first greatest hits album, Greatest Hits 1987–1997, it peaked at number 7 on the RPM Country Tracks chart in June 1997.

Chart performance

Year-end charts

References

1997 songs
1997 singles
George Fox songs
Warner Music Group singles
Songs written by George Fox (singer)
Songs written by Kim Tribble